Ernst Jonas Jonsson (September 30, 1873 – March 14, 1926) was a sailor from the Sweden, who represented his native country at the 1908 Summer Olympics in Ryde, Great Britain. Jonsson took the 5th place in the 6-Metre.

Sources

1873 births
1926 deaths
Swedish male sailors (sport)
Olympic sailors of Sweden
Sailors at the 1908 Summer Olympics – 6 Metre
Sailors at the 1912 Summer Olympics – 6 Metre
Sportspeople from Stockholm